Runella slithyformis  is a bacterium from the genus of Runella which has been isolated from a fresh water lake in Baton Rouge in the United States.

References

Further reading

External links
 Type strain of Runella slithyformis at BacDive -  the Bacterial Diversity Metadatabase

Cytophagia
Bacteria described in 1978